Thérèse Desqueyroux is a 1962 French film directed by Georges Franju, based on the novel of the same name by François Mauriac. Written by Franju and François Mauriac and Claude Mauriac, it stars Emmanuelle Riva and Philippe Noiret. Riva won Best Actress at the Venice Film Festival, the Étoile de Cristal award for Best Actress, and the Silver Goddess Award from the Mexican Cinema Journalists for her performance.

Plot 
Thérèse lives in a mansion in the Landes, a region of pine forests, unhappily married to Bernard, a dull and pompous landowner whose only interest is preserving his family name and property. Her only comforts are her fondness for the surrounding woods and her affection for Bernard's half-sister, Anne.

When an unwanted baby increases her alienation, her mind turns to the medication on which Bernard is dependent. By secretly increasing the dosage she precipitates a crisis, but it does not prove fatal. After enquiries reveal that she had been forging prescriptions, she is arrested. Desperate to save the family reputation, her influential father applies pressure and Bernard perjures himself. Discharged, she undertakes the lonely journey back to Bernard's estate.

Unable to give him any satisfactory explanation, he locks her in a remote room where, allowed only cigarettes and wine, she slowly wastes away. When freed to attend a family gathering and meet Anne's new husband, people are shocked at her sickly appearance. Bernard then moves her to Paris with an allowance, on condition that she returns for family events as his spouse. He still cannot understand why she wanted to kill him.

Production
The film was shot at Studios Franstudio in Marseille, Bouches-du-Rhône, France. The exterior part of the film was shot at Gironde, France.

Cast
Emmanuelle Riva - Thérèse Desqueyroux
Philippe Noiret - Bernard Desqueyroux
Édith Scob - Anne de la Trave
Sami Frey - Jean Azevedo
Renée Devillers - Mme de la Trave
Jeanne Pérez - Balionte
Hélène Dieudonné - Aunt Clara
Richard Saint-Bris - Hector de la Trave
Jean-Jacques Rémy - Specialist

Soundtrack

Long after the film's original release, in February 2005, the French soundtrack record label Play Time released the soundtrack on Compact Disc along with other soundtracks performed by Jarre. This also includes soundtracks from other Franju films, including Head Against the Wall and Eyes Without a Face.

Track listing

References

External links 

 

1962 films
1960s French-language films
Films directed by Georges Franju
1962 drama films
French drama films
1960s French films